No. 321 (Dutch) Squadron RAF was a unit of the Royal Air Force during the Second World War formed from the personnel of the Marineluchtvaartdienst (MLD), the Royal Netherlands Naval Air Service.

History

Formation
Formed on 1 June 1940 at RAF Pembroke Dock, the squadron moved to RAF Carew Cheriton on 28 July 1940 and became operational.  The squadron flew coastal and anti-submarine patrols with Avro Ansons until the squadron was disbanded, due to lack of personnel, and merged with No. 320 (Netherlands) Squadron on 18 January 1941.

Catalinas
The squadron was re-activated at RAF Trincomalee, Ceylon on 15 August 1942. It was equipped with Consolidated Catalinas, which were crewed by MLD personnel who escaped to Ceylon. The squadron's headquarters was located at RAF China Bay with detachments based in Mombasa, Cocos Islands, Socotra, Masirah, Ceylon, Durban, Port Elizabeth, Aden and Cape Town. Supplemented with Consolidated Liberators in July 1945, the air echelon moved to Cocos Island in preparation for Operation Zipper, the proposed invasion of Malaya.

After the Japanese surrender, relief flights and supply drops to thousands of internees in the POW camps were flown to Java and Sumatra, and in October the squadron moved to its new base near Batavia, where the squadron passed to MLD control on 8 December 1945, keeping the same squadron number, No. 321 Squadron MLD. Along with 320 Squadron, it flew maritime patrol missions from Valkenburg for decades afterwards. The Squadron was disbanded in January 2005, due to budget cuts.

Aircraft operated

Commanding officers

References

Citations

Bibliography

 Halley, James J. The Squadrons of the Royal Air Force & Commonwealth 1918–1988. Tonbridge, Kent, UK: Air Britain (Historians) Ltd., 1988. .
 Jefford, C.G. RAF Squadrons, a Comprehensive Record of the Movement and Equipment of all RAF Squadrons and their Antecedents since 1912. Shrewsbury, Shropshire, UK: Airlife Publishing, 2001. .
 Rawlings, John D.R. Coastal, Support and Special Squadrons of the RAF and their Aircraft. London: Jane's Publishing Company Ltd., 1982. .

External links

 Scramble – The Aviation Magazine
 Squadron bases at RAF Commands
 RAF website
 Nos 310–330 Squadron Aircraft & Markings on RAFweb
 Nos. 310–347 Squadron Histories on RAFweb

321
Military units and formations established in 1940
Aircraft squadrons of the Royal Air Force in World War II
Military units and formations of the Netherlands in World War II
Maritime patrol aircraft units and formations
Military units and formations of Ceylon in World War II
N
Netherlands–United Kingdom military relations
Military units and formations disestablished in 1945